The 2017 FedEx Cup Playoffs, the series of four golf tournaments that determined the season champion on the U.S.-based PGA Tour, was played from August 24 to September 24. It included the following four events:
The Northern Trust – Glen Oaks Club, Old Westbury, New York
Dell Technologies Championship – TPC Boston, Norton, Massachusetts
BMW Championship – Conway Farms Golf Club, Lake Forest, Illinois
Tour Championship – East Lake Golf Club, Atlanta, Georgia

These were the eleventh FedEx Cup playoffs since their inception in 2007.

The point distributions can be seen here.

Regular season rankings

The Northern Trust
The Northern Trust was played August 24–27. Of the 125 players eligible to play in the event, five did not enter: Sergio García (ranked 22), Brandt Snedeker (64), Adam Scott (66), Scott Piercy (85), and Dominic Bozzelli (115). Of the 120 entrants, 70 made the second-round cut at 142 (+2).

Dustin Johnson won on the first hole of a sudden-death playoff over Jordan Spieth. The top 100 players in the points standings advanced to the Dell Technologies Championship. This included three players who were outside the top 100 prior to The Northern Trust: Bubba Watson (ranked 113th to 72nd), David Lingmerth (122 to 88), and Harold Varner III (123 to 91). Three players started the tournament within the top 100 but ended the tournament outside the top 100, ending their playoff chances: An Byeong-hun (ranked 96th to 102nd), Robert Garrigus (99 to 109), and Noh Seung-yul (100 to 110).

Par 70 course

Dell Technologies Championship
The Dell Technologies Championship was played September 1–4. Of the 100 players eligible to play in the event, four did not enter: Henrik Stenson (ranked 22), Brandt Snedeker (68), J. B. Holmes (86), and Scott Piercy (94). Of the 96 entrants, 79 made the second-round cut at 145 (+3).

Justin Thomas won by three strokes over Jordan Spieth. It was Thomas's fifth win of the season and Spieth's second runner-up finish of the 2017 playoffs. The top 70 players in the points standings advanced to the BMW Championship. This included three players who were outside the top 70 prior to the Dell Technologies Championship: Stewart Cink (81 to 57), Rafa Cabrera-Bello (80 to 60), and Emiliano Grillo (77 to 62). Three players started the tournament within the top 70 but ended the tournament outside the top 70, ending their playoff chances: Russell Knox (65 to 71), Kelly Kraft (64 to 72), and Brandt Snedeker (68 to 73).

Par 71 course

BMW Championship
The BMW Championship was played September 14–17, after a one-week break. All 70 players eligible to play in the event did so, and there was no cut.

Marc Leishman won by five strokes from Rickie Fowler and Justin Rose. The top 30 players in the points standings advanced to the Tour Championship. This included four players who were outside the top 30 prior to the BMW Championship: Tony Finau (39 to 24), Sergio García (34 to 25), Xander Schauffele (32 to 26), and Patrick Cantlay (41 to 29). Four players started the tournament within the top 30 but ended the tournament outside the top 30, ending their playoff chances: Louis Oosthuizen (24 to 31), Henrik Stenson (26 to 32), Brendan Steele (27 to 33) and Bill Haas (30 to 35).

Par 71 course

Reseed points
The points were reset after the BMW Championship.

Tour Championship
The Tour Championship was played September 21–24. All 30 golfers who qualified for the tournament played, and there was no cut. Xander Schauffele won by one stroke over Justin Thomas but Thomas won the FedEx Cup.

Par 70 course

Final leaderboard

For the full list, see here.

Table of qualifying players
Table key:

* First-time Playoffs qualifier

References

External links
Coverage on the PGA Tour's official site

FedEx Cup
PGA Tour
PGA Tour events
FedEx Cup Playoffs